Cok Istri Agung Sanistyarani (born 31 December 1994) is an Indonesian karateka. She won the gold medal in the women's kumite 61 kg event at the 2017 Southeast Asian Games held in Kuala Lumpur, Malaysia. She won one of the bronze medals in the women's kumite 55 kg event at the 2018 Asian Games held in Jakarta, Indonesia. She also won multiple medals at both the Islamic Solidarity Games and the Asian Karate Championships.

Career 
She won one of the bronze medals in the women's kumite 61kg event at the 2013 Islamic Solidarity Games held in Palembang, Indonesia. In 2014, she competed in the women's kumite 55 kg event at the Asian Games held in Incheon, South Korea where she lost her bronze medal match against Mae Soriano of the Philippines.

At the 2018 Asian Karate Championships held in Amman, Jordan, she won the silver medal in the women's kumite 55 kg event. In 2019, she won one of the bronze medals in this event.

In June 2021, she competed at the World Olympic Qualification Tournament held in Paris, France hoping to qualify for the 2020 Summer Olympics in Tokyo, Japan. In November 2021, she competed in the women's 55 kg event at the World Karate Championships held in Dubai, United Arab Emirates. In December 2021, she won one of the bronze medals in her event at the Asian Karate Championships held in Almaty, Kazakhstan.

In 2022, she competed at the 2021 Islamic Solidarity Games held in Konya, Turkey.

Achievements

References

External links 
 
 

1994 births
Living people
Indonesian female karateka
Karateka at the 2014 Asian Games
Karateka at the 2018 Asian Games
Asian Games bronze medalists for Indonesia
Asian Games medalists in karate
Medalists at the 2018 Asian Games
Competitors at the 2013 Southeast Asian Games
Competitors at the 2017 Southeast Asian Games
Competitors at the 2021 Southeast Asian Games
Southeast Asian Games gold medalists for Indonesia
Southeast Asian Games silver medalists for Indonesia
Southeast Asian Games medalists in karate
Islamic Solidarity Games medalists in karate
Islamic Solidarity Games competitors for Indonesia
Sportspeople from Bali
21st-century Indonesian women
People from Klungkung Regency